Domenico Alfani di Paride was an Italian painter of the Renaissance period, active chiefly in his native Perugia.

Life
He was born at Perugia in 1483. He was a contemporary of Raphael, with whom he studied in the school of Pietro Perugino. The two artists were close friends, and the influence of Raphael is so evident in the works of Alfani that they have frequently been attributed to the more famous artist. He utilized the design given by Raphael for an altarpiece in the Church of San Simone dei Carmini, Perugia, now it is called as  Galleria Nazionale dell'Umbria. Towards the close of his life Alfani gradually changed his style and approximated to that of the later Florentine school. The picture representing the Madonna and Child is one of his earliest known works, which is at the Collegio Gregoriano at Perugia. His works are also found in the old Augustinian Church along with that of  Girolamo da Cremona, Pietro Perugino and Dono Doni.The date of his death, according to some, was 1540, while others say he was alive in 1553. Pictures by Alfani may be seen in collections at Florence and in several churches in Perugia, including San Francesco in Deruta.

His son, Orazio Alfani, was also a prominent painter in Perugia, and founder of the academy of painting in that city. Since father and son were in the habit of painting in conjunction, it is difficult to determine the true authorship of some of the well-known works. For examples, the Holy Family is one of the best disputed works, which is at Uffizi.

See also
 The Virgin and Child (The Northbrook Madonna)

References

External links

15th-century births
1479 births
1553 deaths
Umbrian painters
People from Perugia
15th-century Italian painters
Italian male painters
16th-century Italian painters
Italian Renaissance painters